Charles "Carl" Hooper (23 October 1903 – 10 August 1972) was an English footballer who made 40 appearances in the Football League playing for Lincoln City, Chesterfield and Norwich City. He played in non-league football for numerous teams in his native north-east of England, in the Midland League for York City, and was on the books of Notts County and Sheffield Wednesday without representing either in the league. He played as an inside forward.

Hooper's brother Mark played 500 Football League games for Darlington and Sheffield Wednesday, and other brothers Bill and Danny also played league football.

References

1903 births
1972 deaths
Footballers from Darlington
English footballers
Association football inside forwards
Darlington F.C. players
Cockfield F.C. players
Darlington Railway Athletic F.C. players
Crook Town A.F.C. players
Lincoln City F.C. players
Shildon A.F.C. players
Notts County F.C. players
York City F.C. players
Chesterfield F.C. players
Willington A.F.C. players
Norwich City F.C. players
Sheffield Wednesday F.C. players
Worksop Town F.C. players
West Stanley F.C. players
English Football League players
Midland Football League players